The Center for Computation and Technology (CCT) is an interdisciplinary research center located on the campus of Louisiana State University in Baton Rouge, Louisiana.

In 2003, the Center for Applied Information Technology and Learning (LSU CAPITAL) was integrated as a full research center on LSU's campus as part of the Governor's Vision 2020 plan, and then renamed the Center for Computation & Technology.

CCT's first director was Ed Seidel.  Seidel led the CCT from 2003 to 2008, then accepted a position as director of the National Science Foundation's Office of Cyberinfrastructure (OCI). CCT faculty members Stephen David Beck and Jorge Pullin served as Interim Co-directors from 2008 to 2010. In December 2010, Joel Tohline, the interim director of the original LSU CAPITAL, was named CCT director.

Other faculty and executive staff members at the CCT included Gabrielle Allen, computer scientist and co-creator of the Cactus Framework; Thomas Sterling, former NASA scientist and co-creator of the Beowulf class cluster that is a building block of the world's supercomputers; and Susanne Brenner, recipient of the 2005 Humboldt Research Award.

CCT employs 30 full-time faculty members, all of whom hold joint appointments with other LSU departments, such as the Department of Computer Science, the College of Basic Sciences, and the College of Music and Dramatic Arts, in five Focus Areas: Core Computing Sciences, Coast to Cosmos, Material World, Cultural Computing, and System Science & Engineering. The center has a Cyberinfrastructure Development (CyD) division, originally led by Daniel S. Katz, then Shantenu Jha, and now Steven Brandt; and, in partnership with the LSU ITS department, a group called HPC@LSU that provides support for the campus and statewide cyberinfrastructure, led by Honggao Liu.  CCT employees about 100 students and staff, including research and post-doctoral staff, and undergraduate and graduate students.

The CCT is primarily located in Johnston Hall on the LSU campus, but offices and cyberinfrastructure also are housed in the Frey Computing Services Center. LSU's Supercomputer, SuperMike, was located in Frey and used for nearly five years for advanced research. In June 2007, SuperMike was dismantled to make way for construction of the university's new supercomputer, Tezpur.

Named for one of the world's hottest peppers, Tezpur is nearly three times as fast as SuperMike, and is one of the most powerful supercomputers owned by any university in the nation. Tezpur was one of the 150 most powerful supercomputers in the world when it was launched.

Tezpur allows CCT researchers to use the resources of the Louisiana Optical Network Initiative (LONI), a high-speed, fiber optic network that links supercomputers at the state's major research institutions, allowing greater collaboration on research that produces results faster and with greater accuracy. LONI puts the state on the National LambdaRail, allowing Louisiana researchers to collaborate with scientists around the country.

CCT also houses the Laboratory for Creative Arts & Technology (LCAT), which provides a forum and facility for faculty and researchers to explore the links between technology and creativity. The lab, located in the basement of Johnston, houses dedicated research labs for audio, video, HD collaboration and tangible technologies.

The Red Stick International Animation Festival, which was first launched by LCAT as a way of demonstrating the links between creativity and the CCT's high-performance computing, is an annual event in downtown Baton Rouge that brings together artists, animators, filmmakers, computer scientists and also animation enthusiasts to showcase the latest developments in Louisiana's digital arts and technology sectors.  CCT was also home to Nemeaux, one of the nation's only clusters dedicated to the arts. After five years of service, Nemeaux was retired in October 2009.

References

External links
 

Louisiana State University